Apyre is a genus of moths in the family Erebidae. It was described by Francis Walker in 1854.

Species
Apyre separata Walker, 1854
Apyre lucia Pinas & Manzano, 2000

References

Phaegopterina
Moths of South America